Sir Stanley Unwin, KCMG (19 December 1884 – 13 October 1968) was a British publisher, who founded the Allen & Unwin publishing firm.

Career
Unwin started his career at the publishing firm of his step uncle Thomas Fisher Unwin. In 1914 Stanley Unwin purchased a controlling interest in the firm George Allen and Sons, and established George Allen & Unwin, later to become Allen and Unwin.

The company found success publishing authors such as Bertrand Russell, Sidney Webb, R. H. Tawney and Mahatma Gandhi.

In the 1930s he published two bestsellers by Lancelot Hogben: Mathematics for the Million and Science for the Citizen.

In 1936, J. R. R. Tolkien submitted The Hobbit for publication and Unwin paid his ten-year-old son Rayner Unwin a shilling to write a report on the manuscript. Rayner's favourable response prompted Unwin to publish the book. Once the book became a success, Unwin asked Tolkien for a sequel, which eventually became the bestselling The Lord of the Rings. Tolkien had wanted to publish The Silmarillion, but it was turned down for being "too Celtic"; it was finally published after his death by Allen & Unwin in 1977.

In 1950 Unwin published another bestseller, Thor Heyerdahl's The Kon-Tiki Expedition.

During his career Unwin was active in book trade organs such as the Publishers Association, the International Publishers Association and the British Council.

Personal life
Stanley Unwin was born on 19 December 1884 at 13 Handen Road, Lee, Lewisham, south-east London. His father was Edward Unwin (1840-1933) and his mother was Elizabeth Unwin (née Spicer). Edward Unwin was a printer whose father, Jacob Unwin, was the founder of the printing firm Unwin Brothers.

The publisher Thomas Fisher Unwin was his father's youngest stepbrother, therefore Stanley Unwin's step-uncle. The children's author Ursula Moray Williams was his niece.

Unwin was a lifelong pacifist, and during the First World War, as a conscientious objector, he joined the Voluntary Aid Detachment (VAD).

Unwin died on 13 October 1968 and was honoured with a Blue Plaque at his birthplace.

Further reading

Books by Sir Stanley Unwin
 The Price of Books (London: George Allen & Unwin, 1925)
 The Truth About Publishing (London: George Allen & Unwin, 1926; 8th revised edition, Allen & Unwin, 1976)
 Book Trade Organisation in Norway and Sweden (1932)
 The Book in the Making (London: George Allen & Unwin, 1933)
 Two Young Men See the World (London: George Allen & Unwin, 1934). Joint author: Severn Storr.
 The Danish Book Trade Organisation (London: George Allen & Unwin, 1937)
 Best-sellers: Are They Born or Made? (London: George Allen & Unwin, 1939). Joint authors: George Stevens and Frank Swinnerton.
 Publishing in Peace and War (London : George Allen & Unwin, 1944)
 On Translations (London: George Allen & Unwin, 1946)
 How Governments Treat Books (London: George Allen & Unwin, 1950)
 The Truth About a Publisher: An Autobiographical Record (New York: Macmillan, 1960)
Fifty Years with Father: A Relationship (London: George Allen & Unwin, 1982)

Books about the Unwin family
Philip Unwin, The Publishing Unwins (London: William Heinemann Ltd., 1972)
Philip Unwin, The Printing Unwins (London: George Allen & Unwin, 1976)

References

External links
Unwin, Sir Stanley (1884–1968) in Oxford Dictionary of National Biography

New General Catalog of Old Books and Authors

1884 births
1968 deaths
British conscientious objectors
20th-century British businesspeople
Knights Bachelor
Knights Commander of the Order of St Michael and St George
Officers of the Order of the White Lion